The men's 150 metre medley at the 2013 IPC Swimming World Championships was held at the Parc Jean Drapeau Aquatic Complex in Montreal from 12–18 August.

Medalists

Source:

See also
List of IPC world records in swimming

References

medley 150 m men